Klocek is a surname. Notable people with the surname include:

Ewelina Klocek (born 1987), Polish athlete
Stanisław Klocek (born 1955), Polish ice hockey player
Thomas E. Klocek, American academic

See also
Klocek, Poland
Kloek

Polish-language surnames